Branker is a surname. Notable people with the surname include:

 Anthony Branker (born 1958), American musician and educator
 Kenneth Branker (born 1932), Barbadian cricketer
 Thomas Branker (1633–1676), English mathematician

See also
 Brancker
 Branger